The Light Reaction Regiment is the premier counter-terrorist unit of the Philippine Army. It was formerly known as the Light Reaction Battalion and Light Reaction Company. Due to its specialization in counter-terrorism operations and its formation with the assistance of American advisers, the Light Reaction Regiment has been sometimes referred to as the Philippines' Delta Force.

The LRR is part of the Armed Forces of the Philippines Special Operations Command (AFPSOCOM). It is based at Fort Ramon Magsaysay in Nueva Ecija.

History 

The Light Reaction Regiment can trace its origins back to the year 2000 when non-commissioned officers from the Scout Rangers and 1st Special Forces Regiment (Airborne) were trained by American military advisers from the 1st Battalion, 1st Special Forces Group.

The former LRC, whose members were first drawn from the Scout Rangers and 1st Special Forces Regiment were given further training during the 2002 Balikatan exercises held from February to July 2001, by American special forces insructors from Company B, 1st BN, 1st SFG based in Okinawa. After years of training under American instructors, the LRC was officially activated on February 1, 2004 and was tasked to be deployed in Mindanao in order to combat Abu Sayyaf Group terrorists responsible for abducting several foreign hostages,  with the unit conducting an operation to rescue Gracia Burnham from Abu Sayyaf terrorists. Further exercises had been conducted during the 2006 Balikatan exercises. The LRC had been involved in a rescue operation conducted on a kidnapped Italian priest named Giancarlo Bossi by armed men from a rogue MILF group in 2007.

The unit was involved in the aftermath of the Manila Peninsula rebellion, where they had been deployed to Manila to deter any other Coup d'état attempts. LRC forces have been deployed to Mindanao to conduct anti-terrorist operations in the region. The unit changed its name from the Light Reaction Company to the Light Reaction Battalion in 2008.

50 members of the unit, including 3 officers, were suspended on 9 February 2008, when elements of the LRB came under investigation for the alleged possible killing of innocent civilians on 4 February 2008 during operations in Mindanao against the MILF, known as the Ipil Incident. The unit was cleared of any wrongful doing since the investigation subsequently linked the killings to misinformation provided by an unreliable informant, who was involved in a clan feud and wanted to use the operation to get rid of a rival clan.

In 2014, the unit was again renamed into the Light Reaction Regiment due to its heroic stand in Zamboanga in September 2013. Its elevation to a full regiment was formally sanctioned by Defense Secretary Gazmin on January 16, 2014. A further three companies have been authorized to be added to the already existing three, bringing the total end strength of the regiment up to 600 soldiers. This could prove difficult for the unit as it has almost always been understrength. When deployed to Zamboanga in 2013, the LRB was at only 40% strength.

Recent activity
All 3 companies were deployed to Zamboanga City in September, 2013 and led over 3,000 soldiers and police deployed in the siege. The terrain proved tough for the other units used to fighting rebels in the jungles and remote, uphill areas. The Light Reaction Regiment (still a Battalion at the time) consisted of battle tested soldiers recruited from the Army's elite fighting units, the Scout Rangers and the Special Forces. The unit was undermanned throughout the operation, only being at 40% authorized manpower and had to be augmented by 45 SEALs from the navy's Naval Special Operations Group. Despite the setbacks, the operation was a success, but it cost the lives of 9 LRB soldiers with a further 37 wounded.

In 2014, the LRR conducted a trojan horse operation at a drag race to either kill or capture Abu Sayyaf target Sihata Latip, who was wanted for kidnapping 21 people in Malaysia in 2000. He went on to conduct a string of kidnappings in the Philippines over subsequent years, but as the Philippines got better at counter terrorism operation, the Islamists were cut off from overseas international terrorist finance networks, particularly the ones originating in Saudi Arabia and in order to make up for this loss in income, they engage in kidnapping for ransom. The 24 LRR soldiers trained for a week to execute the mission. They dressed up as if going to a Muslim wedding, rented local jeeps and decorated it. Some soldiers dressed up as women to avoid raising suspicion. One soldier with a M249 light machine gun dressed as a pregnant woman, but forgot to shave on the day of the operation and had to loan a hand fan from one of the female soldiers on the base to cover his goatee. On the way to the drag race one of the jeeps broke down. The commander of the operation decided to go on with the mission with only one jeep and 13 men. When they arrived at the drag race, the LRR operators identified their High Value Target from about 50 civilians and terrorists, approached and drew weapons. A firefight ensued in which the target was killed, but at the loss of a LRR operator who got shot in the neck. The operators loaded up the two bodies and made their getaway, while being shot at by Abu Sayyaf and Moro Islamic Liberation Front.

In May 2017, the regiment spearheaded the army's counter terrorism effort in the Marawi crisis, clearing out the enemy house by house.

On September 4, 2018, the U.S. Counterterrorism Train and Equip Program provided more than 5 million rounds of ammunition worth Php117.4 million ($2.2 million), most of them being used by the LRR.

In May 4, 2020, Col. Monico E. Abang was appointed at the LRR's commander, taking over from Brig. Gen. Monico S. Batle.

Structure

The LRR consists of a Headquarters, a Headquarters Company and three Light Reaction Companies in 2004 with 400 operators.

Training
The LRR recruits from experienced Scout Rangers and Special Forces Regiment operators.

The LRR conducts training with American special forces personnel via bilateral exercises. At least one LRR operator was involved in cross training with the Australian SASR. The unit has trained with British, Indonesian and Malaysian special forces units.

Equipment
M4 and HK416 carbines are used by the LRR as their standard assault rifles.

The SR-25 is used by the LRR as their sniper rifle.

References

Special forces of the Philippines
Regiments of the Philippines
Military units and formations established in 2001
Military units and formations established in 2014
Military counterterrorist organizations
Military special forces regiments
2001 establishments in the Philippines